Ong Kow Meng is a Malaysian politician from DAP. He was the Member of Johor State Legislative Assembly for Senai from 2008 to 2013.

Election result

References 

Democratic Action Party (Malaysia) politicians
Members of the Johor State Legislative Assembly
Malaysian people of Chinese descent
Malaysian politicians of Chinese descent
Living people
Year of birth missing (living people)